Mark Philippi (born 21 March 1963) is an American world champion powerlifter and strongman competitor. Philippi is a  multiple entrant to the World's Strongest Man competition, and former holder of the America's Strongest Man title.

Strongman
As a young man, Mark saw the early strongman competitions featuring his soon-to-be hero, Bill Kazmaier. He has stated that having seen Kazmaier on television he said to himself "I want to be like Bill."  A career in athletic events focused on strength including powerlifting and strength athletics followed.

After winning the title of America's Strongest Man in 1997, he went on to represent his country in the 1997 World's Strongest Man finals, the first of seven appearances. He made the final on 2 occasions, but his greatest success came in the World Muscle Power Championships where he placed in the top three on three consecutive occasions from 1997 to 1999. His progress to become the best in the field was hindered by two major injuries that required extensive rehabilitation.  In 1998, Philippi was severely injured at the 1998 World's Strongest Man during the car flip event where he ruptured his patella tendon and also partially tore his biceps tendon when the car rolled back on him. Surgery and a long rehabilitation followed but when he returned to strongman contests in 2000 he ruptured a patella tendon again. Philippi returned to competition in 2001 and placed third in the America’s Strongest Man contest.

Powerlifting/Football
As well as a successful career as a strength athlete, Mark was also a highly rated world champion powerlifter. He won the WDFPF World Drug Free Power Lifting Championships in 1996. In College, Mark was an offensive lineman and three-year starter at Montana Tech from 1983 to 1987.

Outside competition
Mark opened the Philippi Sports Institute
Mark has written for, and been featured in, Men’s Health, Men’s Fitness, Muscle and Fitness, Sports Illustrated, Las Vegas Life, Ironmind and Powerlifting USA and written or appeared in articles in Sports Illustrated, Men’s Health, Men’s Fitness and the New York Daily News. In addition he lectures on Coaching, Motivation, Strength Training, and Conditioning. For a number of years he has also been an instructor and designer of the Academic Strength Curriculum at the University of Nevada, Las Vegas, Paradise, Nevada.

Statistics
 Height 183 cm
 Weight 138 – 150 kg
 biceps 51 cm
 Chest 150 cm

Personal life
Mark is married to Tracey with whom he has four children (Marc, born 1993, McKayla born 1998, Zach born 2001 and a fourth child born 2004).

Strongman Competition record
 1997
 1. - America’s Strongest Man 1997
 2. - World Muscle Power Classic
 7. - World's Strongest Man 1997, United States
 1998
 1. - Beauty and the Beast
 3. - World Muscle Power Classic
 8. - World's Strongest Man 1998, (injured)
 1999
 2. - World Muscle Power Classic
 2001
 3. - America’s Strongest Man 2001
 2002
 4. - Arnold Strongman Classic
 8. - America’s Strongest Man 2002
 2003
 3. - America’s Strongest Man 2003
 2004
 4. - Arnold Strongman Classic
 9. - Strongman Super Series 2004: Moscow
 6. - World's Strongest Team 2004
 2005
 4. - Arnold Strongman Classic
 2006
 4. - FitExpo Strongman 2006
 10. - Strongman Super Series 2006: Mohegan Sun
 2007
 6. - Strongman Super Series 2007: Mohegan Sun
 5. - Strongman Super Series 2007: Venice Beach
 4. - North America's Strongest Man 2007
 2008
 9. - Strongman Super Series 2008: New York

Other sports

Powerlifting
1996
 1. - 1996 American Drug Free Powerlifting National Championships
 1. - 1996 World Drug Free Powerlifting Federation Championships

American Football
Offensive lineman and three-year starter at Montana Tech (1983–1987)

References

American strength athletes
American powerlifters
Living people
1963 births